Chinese units of measurement, known in Chinese as the shìzhì ("market system"), are the traditional units of measurement of the Han Chinese. Although Chinese numerals have been decimal (base-10) since the Shang, several Chinese measures use hexadecimal (base-16). Local applications have varied, but the Chinese dynasties usually proclaimed standard measurements and recorded their predecessor's systems in their histories. 

In the present day, the People's Republic of China maintains some customary units based upon the market units but standardized to round values in the metric system, for example the common jin or catty of exactly 500g. The Chinese name for most metric units is based on that of the closest traditional unit; when confusion might arise, the word "market" (shì) is used to specify the traditional unit and "common" or "public" (gōng) is used for the metric value. Taiwan, like Korea, saw its traditional units standardized to Japanese values and their conversion to a metric basis, such as the Taiwanese ping of about 3.306m2 based on the square ken. The Hong Kong SAR continues to use its traditional units, now legally defined based on a local equation with metric units. For instance, the Hong Kong catty is precisely .

Note: The names lí ( or ) and fēn for small units are the same for length, area, and mass; however, they refer to different kinds of measurements.

History

According to the Liji, the legendary Yellow Emperor created the first measurement units. The Xiao Erya and the Kongzi Jiayu state that length units were derived from the human body. According to the Records of the Grand Historian, these human body units caused inconsistency, and Yu the Great, another legendary figure, unified the length measurements. Rulers with decimal units have been unearthed from Shang dynasty tombs.

In the Zhou dynasty, the king conferred nobles with powers of the state and the measurement units began to be inconsistent from state to state. After the Warring States period, Qin Shi Huang unified China, and later standardized measurement units. In the Han dynasty, these measurements were still being used, and were documented systematically in the Book of Han.

Astronomical instruments show little change of the length of chi in the following centuries, since the calendar needed to be consistent. It was not until the introduction of decimal units in the Ming dynasty that the traditional system was revised.

Republican Era

On 7 January 1915, the Beiyang government promulgated a measurement law to use not only metric system as the standard but also a set of Chinese-style measurement based directly on the Qing dynasty definitions.

On 16 February 1929, the Nationalist government adopted and promulgated The Weights and Measures Act to adopt the metric system as the official standard and to limit the newer Chinese units of measurement to private sales and trade in Article 11, effective on 1 January 1930. These newer "market" units are based on rounded metric numbers.

People's Republic of China
The Government of the People's Republic of China continued using the market system along with metric system, as decreed by the State Council of the People's Republic of China on 25 June 1959, but 1 catty being 500 grams, would become divided into 10 (new) taels, instead of 16 (old) taels, to be converted from province to province, while exempting Chinese prescription drugs from the conversion to prevent errors.

On 27 February 1984, the State Council of the People's Republic of China decreed the market system to remain acceptable until the end of 1990 and ordered the transition to the national legal measures by that time, but farmland measures would be exempt from this mandatory metrication until further investigation and study.

Hong Kong

In 1976 the Hong Kong Metrication Ordinance allowed a gradual replacement of the system in favor of the International System of Units (SI) metric system. The Weights and Measures Ordinance defines the metric, Imperial, and Chinese units. As of 2012, all three systems are legal for trade and are in widespread use.

Macau
On 24 August 1992, Macau published Law No. 14/92/M to order that Chinese units of measurement similar to those used in Hong Kong, Imperial units, and United States customary units would be permissible for five years since the effective date of the Law, 1 January 1993, on the condition of indicating the corresponding SI values, then for three more years thereafter, Chinese, Imperial, and US units would be permissible as secondary to the SI.

Ancient Chinese units

Length

Traditional units of length include the chi, bu, and li. The precise length of these units, and the ratios between these units, has varied over time. 1 bu has consisted of either 5 or 6 chi, while 1 li has consisted of 300 or 360 bu.

Modern Chinese units 
All "metric values" given in the tables are exact unless otherwise specified by the approximation sign '~'.

Certain units are also listed at List of Chinese classifiers → Measurement units.

Length

Chinese length units promulgated in 1915

Chinese length units effective in 1930

Metric length units
The Chinese word for meter is  mǐ; this can take the Chinese standard SI prefixes (for "kilo-", "centi-", etc.). A kilometer, however, may also be called  gōnglǐ, i.e. a metric lǐ.

In the engineering field, traditional units are rounded up to metric units.

Hong Kong and Macau length units 

These correspond to the measures listed simply as "China" in The Measures, Weights, & Moneys of All Nations

Area

Chinese area units promulgated in 1915

Chinese area units effective in 1930

Metric and other area units
Metric and other standard length units can be squared by the addition of the prefix  píngfāng. For example, a square kilometer is  píngfāng gōnglǐ.

Macau area units

Volume 
These units are used to measure cereal grains, among other things. In imperial times, the physical standard for these was the jialiang.

Chinese volume units promulgated in 1915

Chinese volume units effective in 1930

Metric volume units
In the case of volume, the market and metric shēng coincide, being equal to one litre as shown in the table. The Chinese standard SI prefixes (for "milli-", "centi-", etc.) may be added to this word shēng.

Units of volume can also be obtained from any standard unit of length using the prefix  lìfāng ("cubic"), as in  lìfāng mǐ for one cubic meter.

Macau volume units

Mass 
These units are used to measure the mass of objects. They are also famous for measuring monetary objects such as gold and silver.

Chinese mass units promulgated in 1915

Mass units in the Republic of China since 1930

Mass units in the People's Republic of China since 1959

Metric mass units
The Chinese word for gram is  kè; this can take the Chinese standard SI prefixes (for "milli-", "deca-", and so on). A kilogram, however, is commonly called  gōngjīn, i.e. a metric jīn.

Hong Kong and Macau mass units

Hong Kong troy units 
These are used for trading precious metals such as gold and silver.

Time

Historiography
As there were hundreds of unofficial measures in use, the bibliography is quite vast. The editions of Wu Chenglou's 1937 History of Chinese Measurement were the usual standard up to the 1980s or so, but rely mostly on surviving literary accounts. Newer research has put more emphasis on archeological discoveries. Qiu Guangming & Zhang Yanming's 2005 bilingual Concise History of Ancient Chinese Measures and Weights summarizes these findings. A relatively recent and comprehensive bibliography, organized by period studied, has been compiled in 2012 by Cao & al.; for a shorter list, see Wilkinson's year 2000 Chinese History.

See also 
Chinese numbers & classifiers
Heavenly Stems & Earthly Branches
Units, Systems, & History of measurement
Taiwanese & Hong Kong units of measurement
Japanese, Korean, & Vietnamese units of measurement

References

Citations

Sources 

 Hill, John E. (2015) Through the Jade Gate - China to Rome: A Study of the Silk Routes 1st to 2nd Centuries CE. Vol. I. John E. Hill. CreateSpace, Charleston, South Carolina. .
 Homer H. Dubs (1938): The History of the Former Han Dynasty by Pan Ku. Vol. One. Translator and editor: Homer H. Dubs. Baltimore. Waverly Press, Inc.
 Homer H. Dubs (1955): The History of the Former Han Dynasty by Pan Ku. Vol. Three. Translator and editor: Homer H. Dubs. Ithaca, New York. Spoken Languages Services, Inc.
 Hulsewé, (1961). "Han measures." A. F. P. Hulsewé, T'oung pao Archives, Vol. XLIX, Livre 3, pp. 206–207.
 Chinese Measurement Converter - Online Chinese / Metric / Imperial Converter
 Chinese/Metric/Imperial Measurement Converter
 

Customary units of measurement
Science and technology in China
Chinese units in Hong Kong
Systems of units
Units of measurement by country
Standards of the People's Republic of China